Federico Enrique Neumayer (27 July 1923 – 31 March 1977) was an Argentine swimmer who competed at the 1948 Summer Olympics in the 100 m backstroke.

References

Swimmers at the 1948 Summer Olympics
Olympic swimmers of Argentina
Argentine male swimmers
Male backstroke swimmers
1977 deaths
1923 births
Sportspeople from Rosario, Santa Fe
20th-century Argentine people